Tres Arroyos is an unincorporated community and census-designated place (CDP) in Santa Fe County, New Mexico, United States. It was first listed as a CDP prior to the 2020 census.

The CDP is in northern Santa Fe County and is bordered to the southeast by the city of Santa Fe, the state capital, to the northeast by Tano Road, and to the north by Las Campanas. New Mexico State Road 599 (Veterans Memorial Highway) forms the southeast border of the CDP; across it to the southeast is the CDP of Agua Fria.

Demographics

Education
It is within Santa Fe Public Schools.

References 

Census-designated places in Santa Fe County, New Mexico
Census-designated places in New Mexico